La Neuville may refer to the following communes in France:

La Neuville, Nord, in the Nord département
La Neuville-à-Maire, in the Ardennes département 
La Neuville-au-Pont, in the Marne département
La Neuville-aux-Bois, in the Marne département 
La Neuville-aux-Joûtes, in the Ardennes département
La Neuville-aux-Larris, in the Marne département
La Neuville-Bosmont, in the Aisne département 
La Neuville-Chant-d'Oisel, in the Seine-Maritime département 
La Neuville-d'Aumont, in the Oise département 
La Neuville-du-Bosc, in the Eure département
La Neuville-en-Beine, in the Aisne département 
La Neuville-en-Hez, in the Oise département
La Neuville-en-Tourne-à-Fuy, in the Ardennes département 
La Neuville-Garnier, in the Oise département 
La Neuville-Housset, in the Aisne département 
La Neuville-lès-Bray, in the Somme département 
La Neuville-lès-Dorengt, in the Aisne département 
La Neuville-lès-Wasigny, in the Ardennes département
La Neuville-Saint-Pierre, in the Oise département 
La Neuville-Sire-Bernard, in the Somme département
La Neuville-sur-Essonne, in the Loiret département 
La Neuville-sur-Oudeuil, in the Oise] département
La Neuville-sur-Ressons, in the Oise département 
La Neuville-Vault, in the Oise département

See also
Neuville (disambiguation)
Laneuville (disambiguation)